The lion's roar is a membranophone instrument that has a drum head and a cord or horsehair passing through it. It gets its name from the sound it produces, which closely resembles a lion's roar. The home-made lion's roar is a drum that sits on the floor. The cord then makes friction with the drum head as it is moved back and forth.

Classification

According to the Gary D. Cook classification system of musical instruments it is a chordophone, because it produces sound through the vibration of strings.
It can also be classified as a friction drum.

Form

The lion's roar consists of a cylindrical or bucket-shaped vessel with one end open and the other closed with a membrane. A length of cord or gut is fastened through a hole in the centre of the membrane; the cord is resined and rubbed with coarse fabric or a glove, producing a passable imitation of a lion's roar.

In the past this was always a two-handed operation – one hand held the cord taut, the other gripped and slid up the cord, but in the late 20th century Kolberg produced a mounted model, with the cord held taut, requiring only one hand. In another version of the instrument, the end of the string is loosely secured to a wooden handle to form a whirled friction drum.

Friction drums
Continuous pitch instruments
Lions in culture